Đorđe Obradović (d. 1804), known as Đorđe Ćurčija (Ђорђе Ћурчија) or Ćurta (Ћурта), was a commander in the First Serbian Uprising (1804).  When he heard of the outbreak against the dahija in Valjevo and Šumadija Obradović was operating as a hajduk (highwayman) and in response he "began to attack the Turks more frequently".  He would be purged by his own side before the year was out.

See also
 List of Serbian Revolutionaries

References

excerpt at 

18th-century births
1804 deaths
18th-century Serbian people
19th-century Serbian people
Serbian revolutionaries
Serbian military leaders
People of the First Serbian Uprising
People from Sremska Mitrovica